Alessandro "Alex" da Silva (born 27 December 1981) is a Brazilian former professional footballer who played as a midfielder.

Career
Born in Catanduva, São Paulo, Da Silva progressed through the Internacional academy, before making his senior debut as part of Entrerriense in the Campeonato Carioca. Afterwards, he played for Botafogo, Vasco da Gama and Paraná Clube.

In January 2005, Da Silva joined Danish 1st Division club Randers FC after director Jacob Nielsen and head coach Lars Olsen had scouted him on a trip to Brazil. He officially signed with the club on 19 July 2005 on a three-year deal, after having impressed in a friendly against AGF. His stint at the club was marked by injuries, but he managed to contribute with goals when healthy. During the 2007–08 Danish Superliga season, he struggled to find a place in the starting line-up, despite putting in several good performances. 

Da Silva signed with Viborg FF on 31 January 2008 alongside Randers teammate Søren Ulrik Vestergaard. Viborg had signed and sold on many players during the January transfer window after the dismissal of head coach Anders Linderoth and the arrival of new manager Hans Eklund.

His contract with Viborg was terminated 23 January 2010 because he chose not to return to training after the winter break, unlike the rest of the squad.

After leaving Denmark, Da Silva played for several clubs in his native Brazil before retiring from football altogether in 2018 as part of Penapolense.

Honours
Vasco da Gama
 Campeonato Carioca: 2003

References

External links

Career statistics at Danmarks Radio
 Brazilian FA Database

1981 births
Living people
People from Catanduva
Brazilian footballers
Brazilian expatriate footballers
Sport Club Internacional players
Botafogo de Futebol e Regatas players
CR Vasco da Gama players
Paraná Clube players
Randers FC players
Viborg FF players
Grêmio Catanduvense de Futebol players
Associação Esportiva Santacruzense players
Olímpia Futebol Clube players
Clube Atlético Penapolense players
Danish Superliga players
Expatriate men's footballers in Denmark
Brazilian expatriate sportspeople in Denmark
Association football midfielders
Footballers from São Paulo (state)